The Tissue-Culture King (1926 in Cornhill Magazine and in The Yale Review, reprinted 1927 in Amazing Stories and many times afterwards) is a science fiction short story by biologist Julian Huxley.

The story tells of a biologist captured by an African tribe. It incorporates the idea of immortality based on reproduction from a tissue culture and genetic engineering, and an early mention of tin foil hats and their supposed anti-telepathic properties.

Plot
A group of explorers of Africa stumble upon a strange two-headed toad, and that leads them to meet an endocrinologist Dr. Hascombe captured by an African tribe, who saves himself by using "magical" powers of modern biology.

Critical evaluation
Patrick Parrinder considers the story as an allegory to the servile place of science within a capitalist political world.

References

External links
 
 "The Tissue-Culture King" at the Internet Archive

British science fiction
Science fiction short stories
Genetic engineering in fiction
1926 short stories
Works originally published in Amazing Stories
Africa in fiction
Works originally published in The Yale Review